Richard Lowry may refer to:
 Richard Lowry (psychologist) (born 1940), American psychologist
 Rich Lowry (born 1968), American writer
 Dick Lowry (American football) (Richard B. Lowry, born 1935), American football coach

See also
 Dick Lowry (born 1944), American director and film producer